Sergei Igorevich Ostapchuk (Belarusian: Сяргей Астапчук (Siarhej Astapchuk); March 19, 1990 – September 7, 2011) was an ice hockey player. He was playing with Lokomotiv Yaroslavl in the Kontinental Hockey League (KHL).

Ostapchuk died on September 7, 2011 in the 2011 Lokomotiv Yaroslavl plane crash disaster. The plane was carrying the Lokomotiv hockey team from Yaroslavl to Minsk, the capital of Belarus, where it was to play against Dinamo Minsk in the 2011 season opening game of the KHL.

Career statistics

Regular season and playoffs

See also
List of ice hockey players who died during their playing career

References

External links
 Huskies Player Page & Statistics

1990 births
2011 deaths
Belarusian ice hockey right wingers
Lokomotiv Yaroslavl players
People from Navapolatsk
Rouyn-Noranda Huskies players
Victims of the Lokomotiv Yaroslavl plane crash
Sportspeople from Vitebsk Region
Belarusian expatriate sportspeople in Canada
Belarusian expatriate sportspeople in Russia
Expatriate ice hockey players in Canada
Expatriate ice hockey players in Russia
Belarusian expatriate ice hockey people